Mathew James Willis (born 8 May 1983), also previously known as Mattie Jay, is an English musician, singer, songwriter, television personality and actor. He is known as co-founder, bassist and the co-vocalist of the pop rock band, Busted. Willis released his debut solo album Don't Let It Go to Waste on 20 November 2006, which included three top 20 singles.

In December 2006, Willis won the sixth series of the ITV reality series I'm a Celebrity...Get Me Out of Here!, and later went on to co-present the ITV2 spin-off show with his wife Emma in 2007 and 2008. In 2014, Willis played the role of Garth Stubbs in the revived ITV sitcom Birds of a Feather and Luke Riley in the BBC One soap opera EastEnders.

Early life 
Willis was born in Tooting in London on 8 May 1983. He has an older brother, but their parents split up when he was only three years old. His mother later remarried and had his half-sister.

Willis had three different last names legally while growing up. His original last name was Willis, after his father; this was changed to Woods after his parents split, and later it changed to Sargent after his mother remarried.

Willis has noted he was a "problem" child, regularly sneaking out of the house by shimmying down drain pipes. He also as a child suffered from tunnel vision, asthma and hyperactivity problems. Willis attended Woking High School after being asked to leave his previous secondary school, before leaving to attend the independent fee-paying Sylvia Young Theatre School in Marylebone, London, where he met his now friends Lee Ryan, Tom Fletcher, Billie Piper, Jodi Albert and the late Amy Winehouse.

Career

Music career

Busted
Willis first found fame in the music industry as one third of the pop band, Busted. The band's bassist and vocalist, Willis formed the band as well as co-writing almost all of their songs along with Charlie Simpson, James Bourne and Tom Fletcher, although the latter was a member of McFly. During their career, the trio became successful in the UK and began an upsurge of pop popularity. They had several chart successes and released two studio albums, one live album and a compilation of their greatest hits, available in the U.S.. The band disbanded in 2005 when Simpson left to pursue other projects.

On 10 November 2015, Busted announced on their official website and social media that they would reform with a 13-date starting in 2016. Due to demand more dates were subsequently added. Busted released their third studio album, Night Driver, on 25 November 2016. It was then followed in 2019 by Half Way There. In the latter end of that year, Busted began their first hiatus since the split to give space for the members to pursue other projects.

Solo career
After a brief stint in rehab after Busted split, Matt launched a solo career on Mercury Records, releasing singles in 2005 and 2006, "Up All Night", "Hey Kid", "Don't Let It Go to Waste", and a cover version of The Primitives song, "Crash" for the film Mr Bean's Holiday. Just as he was about to depart on his first solo UK Tour with support band The Riverclub, he sacked his agents of six years, 'Prestige Management'. Willis was later dropped by Mercury.

McBusted

Willis' return to music saw him reunite with one of his ex-Busted bandmates (James Bourne) and with McFly to form the group, McBusted. After a successful tour, they released their debut album McBusted. On 10 November 2015, it was announced that Simpson had decided to rejoin Busted after 10 years away from the band, as a consequence Willis confirmed that McBusted had parted ways for the time being putting the band on hiatus.

Television
In 2006, Willis took part in the sixth series of Celebrity MasterChef. In December 2006 on ITV, Willis was crowned 'King of the Jungle' on I'm a Celebrity...Get Me Out of Here! despite going into the final day as the 8-1 underdog against Myleene Klass and Jason Donovan. Weighing 13 stone 2 lb upon entering, he discovered that he had lost two stone after being weighed again in the jungle. In order to enter the jungle, Willis was required to sky dive from a plane. During his stay, in a compulsory bushtucker trial, Willis ate a kangaroo anus, crocodile penis, crocodile eye, witchetty grub, and some sweeties and mealworms to earn a cooked, luxury meal for himself and the other celebrities. In November 2007, Willis and his then-girlfriend Emma Griffths went to Australia and presented I'm a Celebrity...Get Me Out of Here! NOW! on ITV2, after Willis had won the 2006 series. Following in 2008, the couple were asked back after winning a presenting award earlier that year. Each series lasted over six weeks in Australia during November and December. In early 2009, Willis and his wife did not renew their contract with ITV2 due to the birth of their first child in June 2009. In November 2011, Willis appeared on Big Brother's Bit on the Side with his wife.

Since winning I'm a Celebrity...Get Me Out of Here!, Willis has also pursued various presenting projects. On 14 February 2007, Willis presented ITV2's coverage of the BRIT Awards with Lauren Laverne, Russell Howard and Alesha Dixon and returned to this role in 2008 alongside his wife, Emma, and Laverne. He interviewed Rihanna, Shayne Ward, Adele, Ozzy Osbourne, Kate Nash and many more including Perez Hilton who became very fond of Willis. Following his success in this, he hosted the MTV Hits night of MTV's Spanking New Music Tour 2007 with his wife Emma, live from the Anson Rooms in Bristol on 21 March 2007. In February 2008, Willis presented the Red Carpet coverage for the E! Entertainment network, at the 2008 BAFTA Awards, alongside his wife and Ryan Seacrest.

In January 2014, Willis played Garth Stubbs in the revival of Birds of a Feather on ITV, but did not return for the second series due to McBusted commitments and was replaced by Samuel James. In February 2014, Willis appeared in the short-term role of Luke Riley in EastEnders, the boyfriend of returning character Stacey Branning (Lacey Turner).

In 2022, announcements stated Willis would host a documentary concerning his experiences with addiction.

Theatre work
In 2010, Willis made his theatrical debut as Nick in Flashdance: The Musical, a West-End production. Later that year, Willis was offered the role of Chuck in an adaption of Footloose. Late 2011 also saw Willis take on the role of Fiyero in Wicked. He continued the role until 27 October 2012, when he was replaced by Ben Freeman. In August and September 2018, he starred as Orin Scrivello in Little Shop of Horrors in Regent's Park Open Air Theatre. In 2021 it was announced Willis would be joining the UK tour of Waitress playing Dr Pomatter.

Podcast

Willis is the co-host of comedy podcast When No One Is Watching alongside comedian Matt Richardson. A range of celebrity guests are featured on the podcast, during which they are asked to admit 'the darkest pleasures and weirdest confessions they would rather no one knew about'.

Personal life 

In April 2005, aged 21, Willis stayed for three weeks at London's Priory Hospital for the treatment of alcoholism. In July 2006, aged 23, he was admitted again for a few days for drug abuse, because he was addicted to cannabis from the age of 13. He began to have problems from the drug-taking including physiological and memory problems. In June 2008, aged 25, Willis entered a rehab centre in Bournemouth after a marriage ultimatum, as Willis continued to take drugs and drink heavily. It was reported that a night out with close friend Amy Winehouse pushed Willis too far. Willis took the full five week course in drugs and alcohol. In November 2007, Willis claimed to have stopped smoking, which he had done from the age of 11, but has since been photographed smoking. 

Shortly after completing rehab, Willis was recruited to the Church of Scientology but later left the Church after they reportedly advised that he separate from his then-partner of three years, Emma Griffiths, whom the Church deemed to be a "suppressive person".

On 5 July 2008, Willis married Griffiths at Rushton Hall, Northamptonshire. The couple have three children – two daughters born  in 2009 and 2016, and a son in November 2011.

On 28 February 2010, Willis was injured in a skiing accident.

During the COVID-19 pandemic in 2021, Willis and his wife completed training with St John Ambulance to act as vaccination volunteers.

Discography 

Studio albums
Don't Let It Go to Waste (2006)

Singles

Acting credits

Film/Television

Theatre

References

External links

 
1983 births
Living people
English male stage actors
Male actors from London
Musicians from London
English rock singers
English rock bass guitarists
English male singers
Former Scientologists
I'm a Celebrity...Get Me Out of Here! (British TV series) winners
People from Crouch End
Alumni of the Sylvia Young Theatre School
Busted (band) members
Male bass guitarists
English male television actors
People from Tooting
Servite High School alumni
McBusted members